Machination is a 2022 Maltese horror film directed by Sarah Jayne and Ivan Malekin, starring Steffi Thake.

Cast
 Steffi Thake as Maria
 Rambert Attard as Yorgen
 Sean James Sutton as Ian
 Andrew Bonello as Peter
 Mikhail Basmadjian as Father

Release
The film was released to digital on 20 May 2022.

Reception
Noel Murray of the Los Angeles Times wrote that while the film is "not an easy movie to watch", it is "admirably unflinching in the way it observes Maria’s tics and phobias, showing how even something as seemingly benign and beneficial as hand-washing can become emblematic of a deeper self-loathing."

Fredrico Furzan of MovieBlogger wrote that "the film shows, in a tragic way, how weak we are sometimes when it comes to facing our reality" and closed his review with "This is one of those movies that everyone should see."

Daniel Tihn of the Times of Malta rated the film 2 stars out of 5 and wrote that "after a litany of directionless technical issues", it "ends up being more hollow than haunted."

JP Nunez of the Horror Obsessive called the main character "boring", the plot "mostly meandering and directionless" and the imagery "very random and haphazard".

Mike Haberfelner of Search My Trash wrote this about the directing "a subtle yet empathetic directorial effort" and about the acting he said "a very strong central performance by Steffi Thake really helps make this what it is, a rather fascinating piece of psycho horror with roots in the real world."

References

External links
 
 

Maltese horror films
2022 horror films